Staraya Mushta (İśke Moşto) is a rural locality (a selo) in Novoyanzigitovsky Selsoviet, Krasnokamsky District, Bashkortostan, Russia. The population was 563 in 2010. There are seven streets.

Geography 
Novy Yanzigit is the nearest rural locality.

References 

Rural localities in Krasnokamsky District